Coal Valley is a valley in the U.S. state of Nevada.

Coal Valley was so named on account of coal resources in the area.

References

Valleys of Lincoln County, Nevada
Valleys of Nye County, Nevada